Stephen White (born September 3, 1952) is the writer for most episodes of the children's television show Barney & Friends through 2006, most of the Barney home videos, as well as many books based on the series, scripts for Barney's concerts, and the film Barney's Great Adventure. In addition, he appeared in the 1992 episode "Treasure of Rainbow Beard" as Rainbow Beard himself.

Since 2000, he has been a writer operating under the name Stilton Jarlsberg. His most notable work is Hope n' Change Cartoons, a conservative stock image webcomic.

References

External links
 Stephen White's Official Website
 Stephen White's author page on Amazon
 
 Hope n' Change Cartoons
 Updated version of Hope n' Change Cartoons
  Webcomic set in a children's hospital
−	

American television writers
American children's writers
Living people
1952 births